The 2019 American Athletic Conference women's soccer tournament was the postseason women's soccer tournament for the American Athletic Conference held from November 3 to November 10, 2019. The first round was hosted by the higher seed, and the Semifinals and Final took place at the home field of the regular season champion. Memphis. The six-team single-elimination tournament consisted of three rounds based on seeding from regular season conference play. The Memphis are the defending tournament champions. Memphis was unable to defend its title, losing 2–0 to South Florida in the final.  USF's win was the program's second and also the second for coach Denise Schilte-Brown.

Bracket

Source:

Schedule

First Round

Semifinals

Final

Statistics

Goalscorers 
4 Goals
 Evelyne Viens (USF)

2 Goals
 Dayana Martin (UCF)

1 Goal
 Jewel Boland (SMU)
 Tanya Boychuk (Memphis)
 Brooke Golik (SMU)
 Clarissa Larisey (Memphis)
 Elise Legrout (UCF)
 Ellie Moreno (UCF)
 Lisa Pechersky (Memphis)
 Darya Ragaee (UCF)
 Kimberley Smit (Memphis)
 Jessica Taylor (UCF)
 Allie Thornton (SMU)

All-Tournament team

Source:

* Offensive MVP
^ Defensive MVP

See also 
 2019 American Athletic Conference Men's Soccer Tournament

References 

 
American Athletic Conference Women's Soccer Tournament